Conosara is a genus of moths in the family Geometridae.

Species
 Conosara castanea Meyrick, 1892
 Conosara pammicta Turner, 1919

References
 Consara at Markku Savela's Lepidoptera and Some Other Life Forms
 Natural History Museum Lepidoptera genus database

Ennominae